"Below-the-line" is a term derived from the top sheet of a film budget for motion pictures, television programs, industrial films, independent films, student films and documentaries as well as commercials. The "line" in "below-the-line" refers to the separation of production costs between script and story writers, producers, directors, actors, and casting ("above the-line") and the rest of the crew, or production team.

The top sheet of any creative project's budget serves only as an at-a-glance reference to a fully detailed and attached main budget document, which features total expenses including federal, state and local taxes, as well as insurance within the entire production, and or production incentives. This painstaking task is usually assigned to the Production Manager or UPM of a production  and should be completed before principal photography begins for any project.

Below-the-line crew

Some below-the-line film and television film crews operate in pre-production, production, or post-production stages of filmmaking. For example, the film editor may work solely in the post-production stage of filming but they might also work throughout the production, editing the film as it is shot and advising the director if and when additional shots or scenes are needed. The boom operator, on the other hand, is mostly on set during filming because they have to pick up the dialogue of the actors as well as ambient noise when the scene is being recorded.

This particular type of film crew usually belongs to a guild or union. Some of the unions and/or guilds that represent below-the-line crew include: I.A.T.S.E., The International Cinematographer's Guild (an IATSE organization), The Teamsters, Motion Picture Editors Guild, Animation Guild, and the Motion Picture Sound Editors.

It is usually the case for the "below-the-line" crew to work for hourly wages, as opposed to a set wage, or negotiated contractual wage on the front, or back end of any given project. 
These set workers are responsible for a number of many other unsung, and demanding tasks that must be completed to achieve the common goal of creating a film, or television program. These positions could be considered "less glamorous", and the unmentionable part of filmmaking. However, many dedicated and hard working individuals have made a good living with "below-the-line" job positions, whether it's in independent filmmaking, and or for a major film studio. 

Within the many entry-level positions available to gain knowledge of the industry, such as Lighting technicians, grips, wranglers, stunt performers, property masters, ADR, foley, set painters or any stagehand etc., one could gain knowledge and skill of these, and many other key positions within the film industry.
Many schools and or nonprofit organizations are set up to train the youth and other interested individuals to better prepare and teach a trade that may not otherwise be available within the traditional school system. These organizations teach about film and video terminology, equipment, and life skills, a must for today's highly competitive entertainment market.

Below-the-line crew refers to everybody else including:

Assistant director
Art director
Best boy electric and grip
Boom operator
Camera operator
Carpenter (theatre)
Character generator (CG) operator (television)
Director of photography
Costume designer
Composer
Dolly grip
Film editor
Gaffer
Graphic artist
Hair stylist
Key grip
Line producer
Location manager
Make-up artist
Production assistant
Production coordinator
Script supervisor (continuity)
Set construction
Set Medic
Sound engineer
Stage manager (television)
Technical director (TD) (television)
Truck driver
Unit production manager
Video control broadcast engineering (television)
Visual effects editor

Most of these crafts people are considered variable cost in the budget. Meaning, if you cut a scene from the script, potentially, you don't have to build that set, or paint it or dress it, etc.

See also
 Above-the-line (filmmaking)
 Film budgeting
 Film crew
 Television crew
 List of IATSE locals

References

Film and video terminology